Sher Ali Khan; c. 1825 – 21 February 1879) was Amir of Afghanistan from 1863 to 1866 and from 1868 until his death in 1879. He was one of the sons of Dost Mohammed Khan, founder of the Barakzai dynasty in Afghanistan.

Life
Sher Ali Khan was born into a Pashtun family, Initially he seized power when his father died, but was quickly ousted by his older brother, Mohammad Afzal Khan. Internecine warfare followed until Sher Ali Khan defeated his brother and regained the title of Emir.

Reforms 
Sher Ali Khan's reign as Amir is often remembered for his attempts at reforming Barakzai rule in Afghanistan. Changes brought during the period of Sher Ali Khan's rule include the creation of governmental posts, military reform, the introduction of the first postal service in Afghanistan and the first attempts of an Afghan leader at promoting the Pashto language. 

Sher Ali Khan tried to limit the power of the Barakzai sardars. He didn't allow his sons to administer provinces and instead appointed governors loyal to him. He also had a council of 12 members to advise him on matters of state. He created various ministerial offices like Prime Minister (Sadr-i Azam/صدر اعظم), minister of finance, minister of the interior, minister of war, minister of foreign affairs, and minister of the treasury. 

Under Sher Ali Khan's reign, Afghanistan was divided into 5 provinces: Kabul, Herat, Afghan Turkestan, Kandahar, and Farah. Formerly Farah had been subject to Herat, but instead he made it a separate province and gave it to his cousin, Sardar Mohammad Afzal (not to be confused with Mohammad Afzal Khan).

During his reign, Sher Ali Khan embarked on a project to modernise his armed forces, standardising uniforms and equipment. After being gifted a battery of mountain guns and several howitzers by the British in 1869, Sher Ali realised the potential of breech-loading artillery and was determined to modernise Afghanistan's arsenal. Whilst his early attempts failed, Sher Ali's craftsmen had soon established new workshops at the Bala Hissar Arsenal and began to produce four to five modern breechloaders each month. Despite his successes in producing relatively modern weapons and equipment, a lack of competent officers and poor discipline meant the new cannon were quickly captured by the British during the Second Anglo-Afghan War. British forces captured more than 250 guns from the Afghans during their campaign.

Sher Ali Khan's rule was hindered by pressure from both the British Empire and the Russian Empire, though Sher Ali Khan attempted to keep Afghanistan neutral during their conflict. In 1878, the fragile neutrality fell apart with Sher Ali Khan's resisting of British demands for Afghanistan to accept a permanent envoy in Kabul. The British viewing this as confirmation of Sher Ali Khan's inclination towards Russia, gathered their forces and marched on Kabul. Sher Ali Khan opted to leave Kabul in order to seek political and military aid from the Russian Empire. He died in Mazar-e Sharif, leaving the throne to his son Mohammad Yaqub Khan.

See also 
Great Game

References

External links 

Profile: Amir Sher Ali Khan

1825 births
1879 deaths
19th-century Afghan monarchs
Emirs of Afghanistan
Barakzai dynasty
People of the Second Anglo-Afghan War
Pashtun people
19th-century Afghan politicians